KFC Core is the debut album from Tokyo-Brighton based artist DJ Scotch Egg. The album contains 12 tracks of chiptune and breakcore music which was allegedly recorded with a Game Boy, a loudspeaker, and effects pedals. The album also includes the song 'KFC Song', a song of Barbershop music which includes The Pipettes and The Go! Team (that also featured as the B-side to The Pipettes' 7" single of  'Judy'). The final song, Scotch Orchestra, is basically a conversation between Shigeru and the staff of the London Road KFC in Brighton, about eating the fast food.

Track listing 
KFC Core
Scotch Chicken
Tetris Wonderland
Scotch Heads
Scotch Grime
KFC Song
Scotch Forest
Scotch Attack
Acid Boy Two
Scotch Land
Scotch Out
Knock Knock Sandwich Next Door / Scotch Orchestra

Singles

"Scotch Chicken" vinyl
The vinyl is of poor quality due to having been recorded at the wrong speed. It came packaged in a large picture of a scotch egg.

Scotch Chicken
Scotch Party

Notes

Some tunes on KFC Core are remakes of traditional songs, for instance Tetris Wonderland is a remake of the Russian song Korobeiniki; Scotch Forest is a remake of the theme of In the Hall of the Mountain King and Scotch Land is a remake of Scotland the Brave.
The songs Tetris Wonderland and Acid Boy (sans vocals) are taken from DJ Scotch Egg's Untitled Demo.

References 

2005 albums